Aberayron railway station in Aberaeron was the terminus of the Lampeter, Aberayron and New Quay Light Railway branch line of the Carmarthen to Aberystwyth Line in  Ceredigion, Wales. The branch diverged from the through line at Lampeter.

History
The station was incorporated into the Great Western Railway during the Grouping of 1923, passing on to the Western Region of British Railways on nationalisation in 1948. Passenger services were discontinued in 1951 and freight in 1963. The station was host to a GWR camp coach from 1934 to 1939. A camping coach was also positioned here by the Western Region from 1952 to 1956, the coach was joined by another so there were two coaches from 1957 to 1962.

The station site was later built over for commercial use.

References

Further reading

External links
Lampeter, Aberayron and New Quay Light Railway at Railscot
Aberayron station at Disused stations
Aberayron station on navigable O. S. map

Former Great Western Railway stations
Disused railway stations in Ceredigion
Railway stations in Great Britain opened in 1911
Railway stations in Great Britain closed in 1951
1911 establishments in Wales
1951 disestablishments in Wales